Mihalis Exarchos (born 1978 in Piraeus, Greece), known professionally by his stage name Stereo Mike, is a Greek hip hop artist. He is the first MTV EMA Award winner in the "Best Greek Act" category.  Stereo Mike represented Greece in the Eurovision Song Contest 2011 alongside singer Loucas Yiorkas with the song "Watch My Dance", placing seventh with 120 points.

Life and career
Exarchos was born in 1978 in Piraeus, Greece to a Greek father and Croatian mother from Rijeka.  At the age of 18, his musical interest brought him to the UK for education in the field at the universities Leeds Metropolitan and University of Westminster.  In the next four years, he obtained two degrees, Bachelor of Music Technology and Master on Sound Production.  During his studies, Exarchos worked as a sound producer at Vault Recording Studios in Hackney, London, where he worked with several British hip hop artists, including Klashnekoff, Bury Crew, Skinnyman, Taskforce, Iceberg Slimm, Mike GLC and JMC.

Exarchos also worked as a producer at AMG Records, which led him to his first recording contract as 'Stereo Mike' with AMG's hip-hop sub-label, Mo' Money Recording$.  Within two years, he composed and produced his debut album, while accepting a post-graduate lecturing position at London's University of Westminster in music production.  He released his debut album in Greece titled Satirical Nomads by Mo' Money Recording$ under license to Universal Music Greece.  The album's singles included the anti-racism anthem "O Allos Babis" and the remix "I Polis".

Stereo Mike was nominated at the Mad Video Music Awards in 2005 for "Best Hip-Hop Video Clip" and in 2008 for "Best Hip-Hop Video Clip" and for "Video Clip of the Year".

Stereo Mike subsequently signed to Minos EMI for his second album titled XLI3H, which is leet for the Greek word Εξέλιξη, meaning "evolution". He is concurrently doing research work toward a PhD in music.

Stereo Mike is the first MTV EMA Award winner in the "Best Greek Act" category, which came into effect with MTV's 2008 regional launch in Greece. He was also nominated for Greece in the category of Europe's Favourite Act for 2008.

Stereo Mike with Loucas Yiorkas represented Greece in the Eurovision Song Contest 2011 in Germany with the song "Watch My Dance".

Albums
2004: Satirical Nomads
2007: XLI3H
2011: Aneli3h

Singles
Satirical Nomads:
2004: "O Allos Babis"
2004: "I Polis"

2005 Mad Video Music Awards:
2005: "Pump It/Misirlou" (feat. Eleni Tsaligopoulou, Shaya & Lagnis NTP)

XLI3H:
2007: "Fevgo" (feat. Haris Alexiou)
2007: "Des Kathara (Face à la mer)" (feat. Andriana Babali)
2008: "Anagnorisi"
2008: "Alli Mia Nihta" (feat. Shaya)
2009: "Peraia Mou"

2008 Mad Video Music Awards:
2008: "S'opoion Aresei (Dansonra)" (feat. Tamta)
2008: "Piase Me" (feat. Eleni Tsaligopoulou)
2009: "Peraia Mou"

Eurovision Song Contest 2011
2011: "Watch My Dance" (credited to Loucas Yiorkas feat. Stereo Mike)

References

External links
 Official Facebook page

Living people
Greek rappers
21st-century Greek male singers
1978 births
Eurovision Song Contest entrants of 2011
Eurovision Song Contest entrants for Greece
Greek people of Croatian descent
Musicians from Piraeus
Alumni of the University of Westminster
Alumni of Leeds Beckett University
MTV Europe Music Award winners